Weinfeld is a surname of Jewish origin and may refer to:

 André Weinfeld
 Edward Weinfeld (1901–1988), American judge
 Miriam Akavia, born: Matylda Weinfeld (born 1927), Poland-born Israeli female writer and translator
 Moshe Weinfeld (1925–2009), Professor Emeritus of Bible at the Hebrew University
 Yocheved Weinfeld (born 1947), Poland-born Israeli female painter

German-language surnames
Jewish surnames
Yiddish-language surnames